John Michael Yovicsin  (October 17, 1918 – September 13, 1989) was an American football player and coach.  He played college football at Gettysburg College from 1937 to 1939 and then professionally with Philadelphia Eagles of the National Football League (NFL) in 1944.  Yovicsin served as the head football coach at Gettysburg College from 1952 to 1956 and at Harvard University from 1957 to 1970, compiling a career record of 110–53–5.

Yovicsin was born in Steelton, Pennsylvania and graduated from Gettysburg College in 1940. He returned to Gettysburg as assistant football coach in 1948 and was the head coach there from 1952 to 1956, tallying a mark of 32–11.  During his 14 years at Harvard, Yovicsin amassed a record of 78–42–5.  He helmed the Crimson during the famous 1968 Harvard–Yale Game, in which Harvard mounted a late comeback to tie Yale, 29–29.  Yovicsin's role as coach is mentioned many times in the documentary Harvard Beats Yale 29-29, where players on both the Harvard and Yale squads talk about his professorial bearing.

Yovicsin died on September 13, 1989 of heart disease in Barnstable, Massachusetts at the age of 70.

Head coaching record

See also
 1968 Yale vs. Harvard football game

References

External links
 
 

1918 births
1989 deaths
American football defensive ends
Gettysburg Bullets football coaches
Gettysburg Bullets football players
Harvard Crimson football coaches
Philadelphia Eagles players
People from Dauphin County, Pennsylvania
Coaches of American football from Pennsylvania
Players of American football from Pennsylvania